Jesus Buntu Burake ("Statue of Jesus Christ Blessing") is a Roman Catholic statue of Jesus Christ at Makale in Tana Toraja Regency, South Sulawesi, Indonesia. It stands on the top of Buntu Burake hill about 1.700 metres above sea level. Jesus Buntu Burake also has a glass bridge.

A competition was held in 2013 to work on this statue and is open to the public. After obtaining the winner, in 2014 the foundation of the statue began to be built and construction of the statue was started in 2013, as designed by Supriadi, an artist of Yogyakarta, with the support of Hardo Wardoyo Suwarto, and made on request of the governor of South Sulawesi, Syahrul Yasin Limpo to promote tourism in Tana Toraja. It was developed piece by piece in Yogyakarta. In 2015, the statue was completed. The official inauguration was held on 23 December 2018, by President Joko Widodo as declared on the inauguration inscription on the sidelines of the Tana Toraja Oikumene Christmas celebration.

See also

 List of statues of Jesus
 List of tallest statues

References

Tana Toraja Regency
Buildings and structures in South Sulawesi
Colossal statues of Jesus
Monuments and memorials in Indonesia
Christianity in Indonesia